The 7th Central Auditing Commission of the Workers' Party of Korea (WPK)(7차 조선로동당 중앙 감사위원회) was elected at the party's 7th Congress on 9 May 2016. In its 1st Plenary Session it elected Choe Sung-ho as Chair and Pak Myong-sun as Vice Chair.

Composition
 Chairman Choe Sung-ho(최승호)
 Vice Chair Pak Myong-sun
 Kim Kyong-nam(김경남)
 Hwang Chol-sik(황철식)
 Kim Yong-chol(김용철)
 Ri Yong-ik(리영익)
 Kim Myong-hun(김명훈)
 Kye Yong-sam(계영삼)
 Jo Jong-ho(조정호)
 Kye Myong-chol(계명철)
 Jang Jong-ju(장정주)
 Pho Hui-song(포희성)
 Jong Pong-sok(정봉석)
 Choe Kwon-su(최권수)
 Ho Kwang-uk(허광욱)

References

7th Central Auditing Commission of the Workers' Party of Korea